Ida-Theres Karlsson-Nerell (born 18 April 1983) is a retired Swedish freestyle wrestler.

She was born in Boden. At the World Championships she won a bronze medal in 2002 (55 kg), finished nineteenth in 2003 (55 kg), won a bronze medal  in 2006 (55 kg) and a silver medal in 2007 (55 kg). She finished fourth at the 2004 Olympic Games, and fifth at the 2008 Olympic Games.

At the European Championships she won silver medals in 2001 (56 kg) and 2002 (55 kg), finished sixth in 2003 (55 kg) and won gold medals in 2004 (55 kg), 2005 (59 kg) and 2007 (59 kg).

After the Summer Olympics in 2008 she took a time out from wrestling to, among other things, focus on her family. In 2011, she made a comeback and won a gold medal at the 2011 European Wrestling Championships.

On 27 November 2014, she announced her retirement from wrestling.

References

1983 births
Living people
Swedish female sport wrestlers
Wrestlers at the 2004 Summer Olympics
Wrestlers at the 2008 Summer Olympics
Olympic wrestlers of Sweden

World Wrestling Championships medalists
21st-century Swedish women